The National Experimental University of the Armed Forces (Spanish: Universidad Nacional Experimental Politécnica de la Fuerza Armada Bolivariana, UNEFA) is a Venezuelan public university associated with the Venezuelan armed forces. Founded in 1974 by the former president Rafael Caldera as the National Armed Forces Higher Polytechnical Institution (Instituto Universitario Politécnico de las Fuerzas Armadas Nacionales), it was renamed by the Venezuelan president Hugo Chavez in 1999.

In 2009 it had 61 campuses, and was present in every Venezuelan state except Monagas, with 235,000 students enrolled in May 2009.

Notable people
Keysi Sayago, Miss Venezuela 2016
Hugo Chavez, President of Venezuela
Naomi Soazo, judoka
Diosdado Cabello, President of the Constituent Assembly
Nicolás Maduro Guerra, Politician and Congressman
Vladimir Padrino López, Minister of Defense
José Salazar, Venezuelan

See also
Bolivarian Military University of Venezuela
Military Academy of the Bolivarian Aviation
Military Academy of Health Sciences
Universidad de Oriente
Military Academy of the Bolivarian Army
Bolivarian Military Technical Academy
Military Academy of the Bolivarian Navy
National Guard Military Academy
List of systems engineering universities

External links 

Universities and colleges in Caracas
Military education and training in Venezuela
National universities
Educational institutions established in 1974
1974 establishments in Venezuela